Angry Birds Transformers is a run and gun video game. The tenth installment in the Angry Birds series, the game is a crossover between Angry Birds and Transformers, featuring battles between the Autobirds and Deceptihogs, Angry Birds versions of the Autobots and Decepticons. It is published by Rovio Entertainment with collaboration from Hasbro. The game was released on October 15, 2014, for iOS, released on October 30, 2014, for Android. The release includes related licensed merchandise and a toy line from Hasbro. The game's catchphrase is "Birds Disguised as Robots in Disguise".

Plot
The EggSpark has crashed into the surface of Piggy Island, cyberforming the Birds and Pigs and turning them into the Transformers. It has also turned the eggs into the EggBots, which are turning all pigs (except for King, Foreman, Chef, Corporal, Minion, and Professor Pig) into their minions and then turning non-living things into monsters that want to destroy life, replacing it with technological beings across the island. The Autobirds and Deceptihogs must put their differences aside to destroy the transformed pigs and to chase the mischievous Eggbots, ultimately rescuing the fate of their homeland.

Gameplay
The goal is to survive through the run, shooting at pigs, structures, and targets and transforming into vehicles, including cars, trucks, motorbikes, tanks, submarines, planes and flying saucers (which all stay at ground level)- since failure to survive results in no pigs popped and/or having no health for that character. Pigs can be eliminated by shooting directly at them, but it is sometimes easier to defeat them by shooting at the structures or making TNT explode. Since the gameplay is a side-scrolling video game, pigs who have gone out the screen can no longer be eliminated. The player can use the user's Facebook friends unlocked characters or randomly generated characters to assist in a level for a limited time.

Coins may be collected either during runs, popping pigs and/or simply by waiting and collecting coins that generate over time from freed areas. Some levels or features can be only unlocked when the player has upgraded enough Transformers to level 15. In addition, gems can also be collected and can be used to purchase and to keep going through the run.

Telepods
The game is the fourth game in the franchise to be compatible with Angry Birds Telepods, a toy line that is also used in other Angry Birds games such as: Angry Birds Star Wars II, Angry Birds Go, and Angry Birds Stella. When using Telepods, it can summon the toy's Transformer, and either boost its power or recharge its armor. It is a necessary to scan the toy's QR code each time after the app is closed since the application will "forget" the Telepods the user has previously scanned in.

Comic series
At SDCC 2014, IDW Publishing and Rovio announced an Angry Birds Transformers crossover comic books series; it was written by John Barber and art by Marcelo Ferreira and published in early 2015 as a four issue mini-series.

Reception

Angry Birds Transformers has received generally positive reviews, with a Metacritic score of 70/100 based on 13 reviews. The Guardian praised that the game appeals to Transformers fans, while also providing more proof that the Angry Birds can fit neatly into new stories and game genres, while the downside there are timers of multiple hours to upgrade a character, however gems to upgrade instantly (slowly earned or purchased with real money) make the upgrade happen instantly.

References

External links

 

2014 video games
Android (operating system) games
Transformers
Crossover video games
IOS games
Run and gun games
Transformers video games
Video games developed in Finland
Windows Phone games
Vince DiCola albums
Rovio Entertainment games
Exient Entertainment games